The English Church or Church of England is a Christian church which is the established church of England.

English church may also refer to:
Roman Catholic Church in England and Wales
English Church (Bad Homburg), a former Church of England building in Hesse, Germany
English Church, Balestrand, St. Olaf's Church, Balestrand in Norway
English Church, Stockholm, St Peter and St Sigfrid's Church in Sweden
English church at Amsterdam, English Reformed Church, Amsterdam, Netherlands
Church architecture in England
English church monuments

See also
Christianity in England
English Church Union, name from 1869 to 1933 of predecessor body of The Church Union
English Church and Schoolhouse, name used in NHRP listing for New Hempstead Presbyterian Church, New York, United States
English Lutheran Church, a church in Kansas, United States
First English Lutheran Church (disambiguation)
British church (disambiguation)